Garret T. Sato (November 7, 1964 – March 25, 2020) was an American actor who was born and raised in Oahu, Hawaii. He attended Aiea High School and Leeward Community College where he took up acting. He was Yonsei (fourth generation Japanese American). Prior to his death, he resided in Los Angeles and Oahu, Hawaii.

Acting roles

Film credits
Sato has well over 80 credits, including such films as Midway, The Shadow, Pearl Harbor, Beyond Paradise, Street Kings and The Mask. In 2005, he played a role in Lane Nishikawa's film Only the Brave, about the Japanese American segregated fighting unit, the 442nd Regimental Combat Team of World War II. He had a short film Mojave 43 premiered at the AFI. Sato appeared in the 2013 films The Wolverine, ODE IN BLOOD. In 2016, he was in pre-production on "House Rules" and premiered in five films Megan, Leland, Buddy Solitaire, The Last Tour and Eternal Salvation .

Television credits
He also appeared in numerous television shows such as: The Family Business, Inhumans, Alias, ER, 24 and NCIS: Los Angeles. He was recurring on Hawaii Five-0 as Detective Ahuna. He was quoted as saying, "As an actor I take great pride in the art of acting for it is part of WHO I AM."

Filmography

References

  on Honolulu Advertiser

External links
 
 Official Fan Page on Facebook
 Official Site for Blood Colony

1964 births
2020 deaths
Male actors from Hawaii
American male film actors
American male television actors
American male actors of Japanese descent
American film actors of Asian descent
Leeward Community College alumni